The Ambassador of Malaysia to the State of Qatar is the head of Malaysia's diplomatic mission to Qatar. The position has the rank and status of an Ambassador Extraordinary and Plenipotentiary and is based in the Embassy of Malaysia, Doha.

List of heads of mission

Ambassadors to Qatar

See also
 Malaysia–Qatar relations

References 

 
Qatar
Malaysia